"Return of Hip Hop (Ooh, Ooh)" is a 2001 single by DJ Tomekk from his debut album Return of Hip Hop. The song features KRS-One, Torch and MC Rene. KRS-One raps in English, Torch and MC Rene rap in German. The song peaked at No. 13 in Germany.

Music video
The music video credits DJ Tomekk starring as 'Doctor Love', KRS-One starring as an ambulance driver, Torch as a paramedic and MC Rene as a homeless man. KRS-One raps as he is driving the ambulance, and Torch raps whilst in the back of the ambulance as he stands over a patient with defibrillator paddles. Tomekk is seen dressed as a surgeon performing on turntables in an operating room. MC Rene raps whilst pushing a shopping cart full or garbage, whilst Torch and KRS-One are seen taking their patient to Tomekk. MC Rene follows Torch and KRS-One into the operating room, where it is implied that Tomekk saves the patients life.

Track listing

Charts

References

External links

2001 songs
2001 singles
KRS-One songs
Songs written by KRS-One